Gellifor is a small village in the Vale of Clwyd, Wales. Located at the foot of the Clwydian Range, in the community of Llangynhafal, it is a largely residential settlement. Community facilities are limited but include a primary school and a chapel. The last shop and post office closed around 2000, and residents rely on the towns of Ruthin and Denbigh for access to many services. The population is over 200.

References

Ordnance Survey map reference: SJ 1262

Villages in Denbighshire
Llangynhafal